The 1991 TFL Statewide League premiership season was an Australian rules football competition staged across Tasmania over twenty one (21) roster rounds and six (6) finals series matches between 30 March and 21 September 1991.
This was the sixth season of the statewide competition and The League was known as the Cascade-Boags Statewide League under a dual commercial naming-rights sponsorship agreement with both Cascade Brewery in Hobart and Boag's Brewery in Launceston.

Participating Clubs
Burnie Hawks Football Club
Clarence District Football Club
Devonport Blues Football Club
Glenorchy District Football Club
Hobart Football Club
New Norfolk District Football Club
North Hobart Football Club
North Launceston Football Club
Sandy Bay Football Club
South Launceston Football Club

1991 TFL Statewide League Club Coaches
Richard Lakeland (Burnie Hawks)
Peter Daniel & Leigh McConnon (Clarence)
Peter Knights (Devonport)
Danny Ling (Glenorchy)
Mark Browning (Hobart)
Peter Chisnall (New Norfolk)
Mark Yeates (North Hobart)
 – Steven Goulding (North Launceston)
Paul Jeffrey (Sandy Bay)
Bob Keddie (South Launceston)

St Luke's Cup (Reserves) Grand Final
Nth Launceston 14.16 (100) v Glenorchy 12.11 (83) – North Hobart Oval

Tasmania Bank Colts (Under-19's) Grand Final
Glenorchy 17.15 (117) v Nth Launceston 8.8 (56) – North Hobart Oval

Leading Goalkickers: TFL Statewide League
Paul Dac (New Norfolk) – 133
Byron Howard Jnr (North Hobart) – 106
Shane Fell (Glenorchy) – 73
David Giles (Clarence) – 64

Medal Winners
Gary Williamson (Clarence) – William Leitch Medal
Darren Mathewson (North Hobart) – Darrel Baldock Medal (Best player in TFL Grand Final)
Brendan Skelly (New Norfolk) – George Watt Medal (Reserves)
John Cooley (New Norfolk) – V.A Geard Medal (Under-19's)
Justin Goc (Hobart) – D.R Plaister Medal (Under-17's)

Interstate Matches
State Of Origin Match (Tuesday, 28 May 1991)
Victoria 17.14 (116) v Tasmania 14.20 (104) – Att: 14,086 at North Hobart Oval

1991 TFL Club Home Attendance Figures
Nth Hobart: 18,899 (10) at 1,889
Clarence: 15,652 (10) at 1,565
Glenorchy: 17,180 (11) at 1,561
Hobart: 16,952 (11) at 1,541
Nth Launceston: 16,803 (11) at 1,527
Devonport: 16,644 (11) at 1,513
New Norfolk: 14,896 (10) at 1,489
Burnie Hawks: 9,974 (10) at 997
Sandy Bay: 10,835 (11) at 985
Sth Launceston: 6,656 (10) at 665

1991 TFL Statewide League Ladder

Round 1
(Saturday, 30 March & Monday, 1 April 1991)
Nth Hobart 16.12 (108) v Glenorchy 6.11 (47) – Att: 2,121 at KGV Football Park
Clarence 10.16 (76) v Burnie Hawks 10.10 (70) – Att: 1,186 at Bellerive Oval
Nth Launceston 18.16 (124) v Sth Launceston 5.3 (33) – Att: 1,485 at York Park
Hobart 15.15 (105) v Sandy Bay 13.11 (89) – Att: 1,475 at North Hobart Oval (Monday)
Devonport 11.17 (83) v New Norfolk 7.6 (48) – Att: 1,911 at Devonport Oval (Monday)

Round 2
(Saturday, 6 April 1991)
Nth Hobart 13.19 (97) v Clarence 8.12 (60) – Att: 2,185 at North Hobart Oval 
Sandy Bay 11.16 (82) v Glenorchy 8.10 (58) – Att: 1,102 at Queenborough Oval 
Hobart 21.22 (148) v New Norfolk 16.9 (105) – Att: 1,535 at Boyer Oval 
Devonport 19.12 (126) v Sth Launceston 16.15 (111) – Att: 740 at York Park 
Nth Launceston 12.10 (82) v Burnie Hawks 11.10 (76) – Att: 1,031 at West Park Oval

Round 3
(Saturday, 13 April 1991)
Hobart 25.20 (170) v Sth Launceston 11.17 (83) – Att: 966 at North Hobart Oval
New Norfolk 23.11 (149) v Sandy Bay 19.13 (127) – Att: 1,218 at Queenborough Oval
Glenorchy 10.14 (74) v Clarence 9.13 (67) – Att: 1,712 at KGV Football Park 
Nth Launceston 17.14 (116) v Nth Hobart 13.10 (88) – Att: 2,096 at York Park 
Devonport 22.17 (149) v Burnie Hawks 10.12 (72) – Att: 2,052 at Devonport Oval

Round 4
(Saturday, 20 April 1991)
Nth Hobart 22.13 (145) v Devonport 14.15 (99) – Att: 1,584 at North Hobart Oval 
Nth Launceston 14.18 (102) v Clarence 10.14 (74) – Att: 1,363 at Bellerive Oval 
Glenorchy 13.13 (91) v New Norfolk 11.11 (77) – Att: 1,857 at Boyer Oval 
Sandy Bay 19.13 (127) v Sth Launceston 14.11 (95) – Att: 697 at York Park 
Burnie Hawks 20.14 (134) v Hobart 16.18 (114) – Att: 826 at West Park Oval

Round 5
(Thursday, 25 April & Saturday, 27 April 1991)
Nth Hobart 17.22 (124) v Hobart 13.8 (86) – Att: 2,461 at North Hobart Oval (Anzac Day)
Sandy Bay 11.13 (79) v Burnie Hawks 9.11 (65) – Att: 961 at Queenborough Oval
New Norfolk 19.20 (134) v Sth Launceston 13.8 (86) – Att: 1,388 at Boyer Oval
Nth Launceston 15.27 (117) v Glenorchy 11.9 (75) – Att: 1,666 at York Park
Devonport 16.7 (103) v Clarence 13.21 (99) – Att: 1,399 at Devonport Oval

Round 6
(Saturday, 4 May 1991)
Nth Hobart 21.24 (150) v Sandy Bay 17.8 (110) – Att: 1,475 at North Hobart Oval
Glenorchy 22.13 (145) v Sth Launceston 11.12 (78) – Att: 1,001 at KGV Football Park 
Clarence 13.12 (90) v Hobart 9.15 (69) – Att: 1,744 at Bellerive Oval 
Nth Launceston 16.15 (111) v Devonport 11.7 (73) – Att: 2,277 at York Park 
Burnie Hawks 21.16 (142) v New Norfolk 16.7 (103) – Att: 921 at West Park Oval

Round 7
(Saturday, 11 May 1991)
Nth Launceston 13.11 (89) v Hobart 12.14 (86) – Att: 1,460 at North Hobart Oval
Clarence 16.19 (115) v Sandy Bay 17.8 (110) – Att: 1,374 at Queenborough Oval 
Nth Hobart 15.14 (104) v New Norfolk 14.15 (99) – Att: 1,577 at Boyer Oval 
Burnie Hawks 27.19 (181) v Sth Launceston 6.12 (48) – Att: 628 at York Park
Glenorchy 14.6 (90) v Devonport 11.16 (82) – Att: 1,558 at Devonport Oval

Round 8
(Saturday, 18 May 1991)
Nth Hobart 37.24 (246) v Sth Launceston 2.5 (17) – Att: 842 at North Hobart Oval
Glenorchy 15.17 (107) v Burnie Hawks 12.14 (86) – Att: 1,339 at KGV Football Park 
Clarence 12.22 (94) v New Norfolk 11.15 (81) – Att: 1,920 at Bellerive Oval 
Sandy Bay 17.15 (117) v Nth Launceston 17.13 (115) – Att: 1,335 at York Park
Devonport 26.15 (171) v Hobart 15.8 (98) – Att: 1,427 at Devonport Oval

Round 9
(Saturday, 25 May 1991)
Glenorchy 17.10 (112) v Hobart 12.16 (88) – Att: 2,269 at North Hobart Oval
Devonport 19.14 (128) v Sandy Bay 16.11 (107) – Att: 917 at Queenborough Oval
Nth Launceston 15.18 (108) v New Norfolk 14.9 (93) – Att: 1,248 at Boyer Oval
Clarence 25.21 (171) v Sth Launceston 10.10 (70) – Att: 614 at York Park
Nth Hobart 21.26 (152) v Burnie Hawks 15.9 (99) – Att: 1,370 at West Park Oval

Round 10
(Saturday, 1 June 1991)
Nth Hobart 24.20 (164) v Glenorchy 14.15 (99) – Att: 2,395 at North Hobart Oval
Hobart 18.24 (132) v Sandy Bay 10.12 (72) – Att: 1,044 at Queenborough Oval
New Norfolk 23.8 (146) v Devonport 16.11 (107) – Att: 1,270 at Boyer Oval
Nth Launceston 33.16 (214) v Sth Launceston 6.10 (46) – Att: 950 at York Park
Burnie Hawks 19.8 (122) v Clarence 13.11 (89) – Att: 949 at West Park Oval

Round 11
(Saturday, 8 June & Monday, 10 June 1991)
Hobart 14.18 (102) v New Norfolk 14.12 (96) – Att: 1,973 at North Hobart Oval
Glenorchy 19.12 (126) v Sandy Bay 13.15 (93) – Att: 1,360 at KGV Football Park
Devonport 21.16 (142) v Sth Launceston 10.9 (69) – Att: 917 at Devonport Oval
Clarence 12.7 (79) v Nth Hobart 9.12 (66) – Att: 2,476 at Bellerive Oval (Monday)
Nth Launceston 24.12 (156) v Burnie Hawks 17.14 (116) – Att: 1,437 at York Park (Monday)

Round 12
(Saturday, 22 June & Sunday, 23 June 1991)
Clarence 13.17 (95) v Glenorchy 10.13 (73) – Att: 2,067 at Bellerive Oval 
New Norfolk 14.16 (100) v Sandy Bay 9.13 (67) – Att: 1,191 at Boyer Oval 
Hobart 21.15 (141) v Sth Launceston 15.14 (104) – Att: 550 at York Park 
Burnie Hawks 13.8 (86) v Devonport 7.13 (55) – Att: 1,602 at West Park Oval 
Nth Launceston 14.16 (100) v Nth Hobart 12.9 (81) – Att: 2,229 at North Hobart Oval (Sunday)

Round 13
(Saturday, 29 June 1991)
Hobart 12.17 (89) v Burnie Hawks 7.11 (53) – Att: 1,047 at North Hobart Oval
Sandy Bay 22.19 (151) v Sth Launceston 9.10 (64) – Att: 585 at Queenborough Oval
New Norfolk 17.18 (120) v Glenorchy 10.18 (78) – Att: 2,034 at KGV Football Park
Clarence 19.15 (129) v Nth Launceston 15.14 (104) – Att: 1,472 at York Park
Devonport 13.13 (91) v Nth Hobart 12.14 (86) – Att: 1,201 at Devonport Oval

Round 14
(Saturday, 6 July & Sunday, 7 July 1991)
Nth Launceston 21.18 (144) v Glenorchy 14.14 (98) – Att: 1,110 at KGV Football Park 
Clarence 17.13 (115) v Devonport 12.5 (77) – Att: 1,544 at Bellerive Oval
New Norfolk 22.18 (150) v Sth Launceston 19.9 (123) – Att: 755 at York Park * 
Burnie Hawks 15.10 (100) v Sandy Bay 10.12 (72) – Att: 914 at West Park Oval
Nth Hobart 23.14 (152) v Hobart 14.13 (97) – Att: 2,225 at North Hobart Oval (Sunday) 
Note: Paul Dac (New Norfolk) registers his 100th goal for the season, 26-minutes into the third quarter.

Round 15
(Saturday, 13 July & Sunday, 14 July 1991)
Clarence 21.20 (146) v Hobart 7.11 (53) – Att: 1,791 at North Hobart Oval 
Nth Hobart 15.8 (98) v Sandy Bay 10.12 (72) – Att: 951 at Queenborough Oval 
New Norfolk 22.8 (140) v Burnie Hawks 12.9 (81) – Att: 1,605 at Boyer Oval 
Glenorchy 17.21 (123) v Sth Launceston 15.11 (101) – Att: 598 at York Park 
Nth Launceston 15.11 (101) v Devonport 8.9 (57) – Att: 2,238 at Devonport Oval (Sunday)

Round 16
(Saturday, 20 July 1991)
Nth Hobart 19.16 (130) v New Norfolk 9.11 (65) – Att: 2,049 at North Hobart Oval 
Devonport 11.11 (77) v Glenorchy 8.15 (63) – Att: 1,025 at KGV Football Park 
Clarence 15.11 (101) v Sandy Bay 9.13 (67) – Att: 1,285 at Bellerive Oval 
Nth Launceston 27.17 (179) v Hobart 16.9 (105) – Att: 1,255 at York Park 
Burnie Hawks 20.18 (138) v Sth Launceston 13.10 (88) – Att: 764 at West Park Oval

Round 17
(Saturday, 27 July 1991)
Hobart 21.17 (143) v Devonport 16.9 (105) – Att: 1,633 at North Hobart Oval 
Nth Launceston 20.10 (130) v Sandy Bay 15.11 (101) – Att: 730 at Queenborough Oval  
Clarence 18.8 (116) v New Norfolk 11.15 (81) – Att: 1,633 at Boyer Oval 
Nth Hobart 17.15 (117) v Sth Launceston 3.3 (21) – Att: 512 at York Park 
Burnie Hawks 7.8 (50) v Glenorchy 4.7 (31) – Att: 660 at West Park Oval

Round 18
(Saturday, 3 August 1991)
Nth Hobart 22.15 (147) v Burnie Hawks 14.20 (104) – Att: 1,148 at North Hobart Oval 
Glenorchy 21.7 (133) v Hobart 8.17 (65) – Att: 1,492 at KGV Football Park 
Clarence 28.24 (192) v Sth Launceston 8.5 (53) – Att: 820 at Bellerive Oval 
Nth Launceston 8.8 (56) v New Norfolk 4.12 (36) – Att: 875 at York Park 
Devonport 8.10 (58) v Sandy Bay 2.4 (16) – Att: 698 at Devonport Oval

Round 19
(Saturday, 10 August 1991)
Sandy Bay 13.10 (88) v Hobart 12.14 (86) – Att: 1,072 at North Hobart Oval 
Nth Hobart 24.16 (160) v Glenorchy 13.12 (90) – Att: 1,946 at KGV Football Park 
Clarence 19.25 (139) v Burnie Hawks 8.14 (62) – Att: 1,295 at Bellerive Oval 
Nth Launceston 23.20 (158) v Sth Launceston 9.9 (63) – Att: 875 at York Park 
New Norfolk 22.14 (146) v Devonport 11.6 (72) – Att: 1,128 at Devonport Oval

Round 20
(Saturday, 17 August 1991)
Clarence 17.13 (115) v Nth Hobart 15.12 (102) – Att: 2,767 at North Hobart Oval 
Sandy Bay 10.19 (79) v Glenorchy 11.13 (79) – Att: 921 at Queenborough Oval 
Hobart 12.15 (87) v New Norfolk 12.9 (81) – Att: 1,592 at Boyer Oval 
Sth Launceston 12.25 (97) v Devonport 11.10 (76) – Att: 612 at Youngtown Memorial Ground * 
Burnie Hawks 18.12 (120) v Nth Launceston 8.14 (62) – Att: 937 at West Park Oval 
Notes: South Launceston breaks a 34-match losing streak, their match was transferred to Youngtown due to groundsman's tractor being bogged on York Park.

Round 21
(Saturday, 24 August 1991)
Hobart 30.16 (196) v Sth Launceston 14.12 (96) – Att: 843 at North Hobart Oval 
Sandy Bay 16.10 (106) v New Norfolk 15.8 (98) – Att: 960 at Queenborough Oval 
Clarence 18.9 (117) v Glenorchy 12.14 (86) – Att: 2,040 at KGV Football Park 
Nth Hobart 13.10 (88) v Nth Launceston 11.14 (80) – Att: 2,030 at York Park 
Burnie Hawks 18.9 (117) v Devonport 7.11 (53) – Att: 2,115 at Devonport Oval

Qualifying Final
(Saturday, 30 August 1991)
Clarence: 2.1 (13) | 7.6 (48) | 10.10 (70) | 13.18 (96)
Nth Hobart: 0.2 (2) | 2.2 (14) | 6.2 (38) | 9.6 (60)
Attendance: 4,052 at North Hobart Oval

Elimination Final
(Sunday, 1 September 1991)
Burnie Hawks: 4.5 (29) | 14.8 (92) | 15.12 (102) | 20.19 (139)
Hobart: 2.4 (16) | 3.6 (24) | 11.10 (76) | 14.11 (95)
Attendance: 2,705 at Devonport Oval

First Semi Final
(Sunday, 7 September 1991)
Nth Hobart: 6.4 (40) | 10.12 (72) | 11.21 (87) | 17.23 (125)
Burnie Hawks: 2.0 (12) | 4.3 (27) | 8.8 (56) | 10.12 (72)
Attendance: 3,022 at North Hobart Oval

Second Semi Final
(Saturday, 6 September 1991)
Nth Launceston: 3.3 (21) | 9.4 (58) | 14.5 (89) | 15.11 (101)
Clarence: 1.6 (12) | 5.10 (40) | 8.12 (60) | 13.14 (92)
Attendance: 4,398 at York Park

Preliminary Final
(Saturday, 13 September 1991)
Nth Hobart: 7.7 (49) | 8.12 (60) | 12.16 (88) | 14.19 (103)
Clarence: 1.2 (8) | 4.7 (31) | 6.11 (47) | 11.16 (82)
Attendance: 5,649 at North Hobart Oval

Grand Final
(Saturday, 20 September 1991) (ABC-TV highlights: 1991 TFL Grand Final)
Nth Hobart: 2.5 (17) | 5.7 (37) | 7.9 (51) | 12.14 (86)
Nth Launceston: 2.2 (14) | 7.7 (49) | 7.11 (53) | 8.12 (60)
Attendance: 13,112 at North Hobart Oval

Sources: All scores and statistics courtesy of The Mercury and Sunday Tasmanian newspapers.

Tasmanian Football League seasons